Blonde Charity Mafia was a reality television series produced by Patty Ivins and Julie Pizzi of PB&J Television that followed the lives of three socialites whose lives revolved around charity events. The show did not air in the United States. It was, however, shown on MTV Australia, MTV UK, and MTV New Zealand, as well as on Star! and other channels in about a dozen other countries. The show was bootlegged from Europe and shown on a website, and had a cult-like following in the United States – particularly in Washington, D.C. – for a brief period of time.

Network and premiere date changes and cancellation 
Blonde Charity Mafia was developed by the Lifetime network, and filmed in September 2008 on location in Washington, D.C. After production was completed, Lifetime decided to sell the series to The CW rather than airing it. The CW scheduled the series premiere for July 7, 2009 at 9 p.m. Eastern/8 p.m. Central. However, the network later decided to forgo all new programming for that summer, and planned to broadcast the series in the winter as a midseason replacement. Sometime after that, The CW apparently lost interest in the show; it removed references to the series from its websites, and on December 29, officially confirmed that it would not air on the network. Blonde Charity Mafia was apparently dropped in favor of two reality series developed by The CW, Fly Girls, about Virgin America flight attendants, and High Society, which followed socialite Tinsley Mortimer. On May 20, 2010, not long after completing their eight-episode runs, both of these series were canceled as well.

Where Are They Now: 2012

Katherine Kennedy is a principal at Availor Group, which invests in tech-based for-profit, for-purpose companies in the areas of health and wellness, education, and innovative philanthropy. She is also the face of the Prevent Cancer Foundation.

Krista Johnson owns a consignment designer women's fashion boutique in Georgetown called Ella Rue, which is not to be confused with the shop from the show (We One You Too).

Sophie Pyle founded Rosé Media, a social media company for luxury businesses. Prior to this, she was the DC Editor of the society snapshot blog Guest of a Guest.

References

External links

www.PBandJTelevision.com

2009 American television series debuts
2009 American television series endings
2000s American reality television series
The CW original programming